Pulsatrix is a genus of owl in the family Strigidae. They are called spectacled owls because of their prominent facial pattern. The genus contains the following species:
 Spectacled owl,  Pulsatrix perspicillata
 Tawny-browed owl,  Pulsatrix koeniswaldiana
 Band-bellied owl,  Pulsatrix melanota

Pulsatrix arredondoi is a fossil species from the Late Pleistocene of Cueva de Paredones, Cuba.

 
Bird genera
Taxonomy articles created by Polbot